The Chancellor of the Order of the Thistle is an office of the Order of the Thistle, established in 1687. The Chancellor is normally one of the knights, though not necessarily the most senior.

Office Holders from 1913
1913: John James Hugh Henry Stewart-Murray, 7th Duke of Atholl (1840-1917)
1917: Douglas Graham, 5th Duke of Montrose (1852-1925)
1926: Henry John Innes-Ker, 8th Duke of Roxburghe (1876-1932)
1932: Walter Erskine, Earl of Mar and Kellie (1865-1955)
1949: Sidney Buller-Fullerton-Elphinstone, 16th Lord Elphinstone (1869-1955)
1956: David Lyulph Gore Wolseley Ogilvy, 12th Earl of Airlie (1893-1968)
1966: Walter Montagu-Douglas-Scott, 8th Duke of Buccleuch (1894-1973)
1973: Lord Home of the Hirsel (1903-1995)
1992: John Scott, 9th Duke of Buccleuch (1923-2007)
2007: David Ogilvy, 13th Earl of Airlie (1926-)

References

Order of the Thistle